{{Speciesbox 
| image = Vertigo genesii shell.jpg
| image_caption = Drawing of the shell of Vertigo genesii.
| status = LC
| status_system = IUCN3.1
| status_ref = 
| taxon = Vertigo genesii
| authority = (Gredler, 1856)
| synonyms =
' 'Pupa genesii Gredler, 1856
 Vertigo (Glacivertigo) genesii (Gredler, 1856) (unaccepted subgeneric classification)
 Vertigo (Vertigo) genesii (Gredler, 1856) · alternate representation
}}Vertigo genesii'', common name the round-mouthed whorl snail, is a species of minute air-breathing land snail, a terrestrial pulmonate gastropod mollusc or micromollusc in the family Vertiginidae, the whorl snails.

Shell description 
The shell is very small, ovate, obtuse, indistinctly, spaced striate, glossy purplish brown. The shell has 4½ whorls, that are rather convex, high, rapidly increasing, joined by a somewhat impressed suture, the penult large, almost ventricose. Umbilical opening is moderate.

The aperture is semirotund, nearly quadratic, without any folds. Peristome is scarcely expanded, thickened liplike, bordered with bluish black, the margins are connected by a very weak callus, the right margin is arched at the insertion.

The width of the adult shell is 1.03–1.20 mm, the height is 1.63–2.00 mm.

Anatomy 
The animal body color is raven-black. The tentacles are short, contracted in the middle.

Distribution and conservation status

 IUCN red list - conservation dependent
 It is mentioned in Annex II of the European Union's Habitats Directive.
This species occurs in:
 British Isles (in the United Kingdom only): Great Britain. It is endangered in Great Britain and it is listed in List of endangered species in the British Isles.
 Continental Europe: Finland, Germany, Norway, Poland, Romania, Russian Federation, Sweden, and Switzerland.

References
This article incorporates public domain text from reference.

 Bank, R. A.; Neubert, E. (2017). Checklist of the land and freshwater Gastropoda of Europe. Last update: July 16th, 201

External links
 http://www.animalbase.uni-goettingen.de/zooweb/servlet/AnimalBase/home/species?id=1686
 Gredler, V. M. (1856). Tirols Land- und Süßwasser-Conchylien I. Die Landconchylien. Verhandlungen der Kaiserlich-königlichen Zoologisch-botanischen Gesellschaft in Wien. 6: 25–162. Wien.

genesii
Gastropods described in 1856
Molluscs of Europe